Vukovar water tower is a water tower in the Croatian city of Vukovar. It is one of the most famous symbols of Vukovar and the suffering of the city and the country in the Battle of Vukovar and the Croatian War of Independence, when the water tower and the city itself were largely destroyed by the Yugoslav forces.

History

The water tower was designed by the company Plan and built by Hidrotehna Zagreb, in the late 1960s. It was built in a city park, popularly known as Najpar-bašća, in the district of Mitnica.

Until the war, the top of the tower was home to a restaurant with a view over Vukovar, Danube and surrounding vineyards.

During the Battle of Vukovar, the water tower was one of the most frequent targets of artillery. It was hit more than 600 times during the siege.

Today, it has been converted into a museum with a restaurant. Traces of the war are still evident. Since 10 March 2021 it has been a Tower Member of the World Federation of Great Towers.

Present
After the reintegration of Vukovar into the Republic of Croatia, reconstruction of the water tower was initiated by Croatian President Franjo Tuđman, but the process was dropped and the tower instead become a memorial area to the pain and suffering that Vukovar endured. It was officially opened on 30 October 2020, with public access becoming available the following day.

References

External links
 

Towers completed in 1968
Water towers
Buildings and structures in Vukovar
Croatian War of Independence